Senator Kelley may refer to:

Alfred Kelley (1789–1859), Ohio State Senate
Delores G. Kelley (born 1936), Maryland State Senate
Edward J. Kelley (1883–1960), Connecticut State Senate
Harrison Kelley (1836–1897), Kansas State Senate
James Kelley (Pennsylvania state senator) (born 1932/1933), Pennsylvania State Senate
Robert S. Kelley (1831–1890), Kansas State Senate
Steve Kelley (politician) (born 1953), Minnesota State Senate

See also
Senator Kelly (disambiguation)